Oliver Lovell Clark (February 1836 – May 12, 1908) was the fifteenth President of the Chico Board of Trustees, the governing body of Chico, California from 1899 to 1907.

He was born in Vermont, the son of Willam C. and Mary Clark.

In 1882, he was a member of the board of directors of the Upper Sacramento Agricultural Society.

In 1901, he was a delegate to the California Chinese Exclusion Convention.

In 1902, he was a delegate to the League of Municipalities of California.

Associations 
 Member, Royal Arch Masons

References 

1836 births
1908 deaths
California city council members
Mayors of Chico, California
19th-century American farmers
19th-century American politicians
20th-century American farmers